The Leeds municipal elections were held on Thursday 10 April 1958, with one third of the seats and a double vacancy in Bramley to be elected.

Labour achieved a further swing of 0.3%, to take two more seats from the Conservatives. The two gains were in Westfield - where the incumbents 7.5% swing was not enough to hold on - and Wortley, with Labour narrowly gaining on a 78-vote majority as the main beneficiaries of the Liberal absence this time around. As well as those two gains, Labour gained one in the new aldermen division, increasing their majority on the council to 34. A notable feat of the election was the Liberals managing to push the Conservatives into third in the two wards of Holbeck and Middleton - a post-war first. Turnout rose by a percentage point on the previous year, to 37.2%.

Election result

The result had the following consequences for the total number of seats on the council after the elections:

Ward results

References

1958 English local elections
1958
1950s in Leeds